Written and illustrated by Nobuhiro Watsuki, with occasional writing assistance from his wife Kaoru Kurosaki, Buso Renkin was serialized in Shueisha's shōnen magazine, Weekly Shōnen Jump from June 2003 to 2005, ending at 80 chapters. The individual chapters were collected by Shueisha into 10 tankōbon volumes which were released between January 5, 2004 and April 4, 2006. Viz Media released the manga's ten tankōbon volumes between August 1, 2006 and February 5, 2008. The manga is licensed in France by Glénat, and in Germany by Tokyopop Germany.



Volumes list

References

External links

Buso Renkin, Viz Media webpage

Buso Renkin